The GippsAero GA8 Airvan 8 is a single-engined utility aircraft manufactured by GippsAero (formerly named Gippsland Aeronautics) of Victoria, Australia. It can seat up to eight people, including the pilot.

The GA8 has been designed for use in remote areas and from austere air strips, performing tasks such as passenger services, freight, sightseeing, parachuting, observation, and intelligence, surveillance and reconnaissance (ISR) and search and rescue operations. Its design emphasises ruggedness and ease of use. First flown on 3 March 1995 and type certified under Federal Aviation Administration (FAA) Part 23 requirements during summer 2004, the GA8 has been flown by a diverse range of operators throughout the world.

Since its introduction, improved models featuring more powerful engines have been introduced; an enlarged turboprop-powered derivative, designated as the Gippsland GA10, has also been developed. A floatplane model of the GA8 has also been produced. At EAA Oshkosh 2014, the GA8 Airvan was officially renamed as Mahindra Airvan 8 as a reflection of GippsAero's recent acquisition by Indian conglomerate Mahindra Group. The aircraft was produced in Australia; establishment of a North American final assembly line to produce the type was proposed at one time. In November 2020, the Indian conglomerate Mahindra, which had purchased the company, announced that production would cease at that time, citing the financial effects of the global economic slowdown due to the COVID-19 pandemic.

Development

According to aviation publication Flying, the aircraft was designed to fill a market niche perceived by the manufacturer between the six-seat Cessna 206 and fourteen-seat Cessna 208 Caravan models. The GA8's design was primarily produced by Peter Furlong. The aircraft was certified as conforming with the stringent Part 23 requirements of the Federal Aviation Administration (FAA); accordingly, elements were subject to dynamic testing, as well as the controllability of the aircraft with the loss of any primary flight control validated.The GA8 received its type certification in 2004.

The GA8 has been used in various roles, including passenger services, freight, sightseeing, parachuting, observation, and search and rescue operations. It has been designed for use in remote areas and from austere air strips.

A turbocharged version of the aircraft was in planning from 2002, and the prototype turbocharged aircraft commenced flight testing in October 2006.  In February 2009, Gippsland Aeronautics announced that the Australian Civil Aviation Safety Authority had issued an amendment to the GA8 type certificate to cover the turbocharged variant. This version is designated as the GA8-TC320 and is powered by a 320 HP Lycoming TIO-540-AH1A turbocharged fuel-injected engine. The first deliveries of this model took place in February 2009; within two years, numerous GA8-TC320 Airvans had been delivered to customers in Australia and New Zealand.

A turboprop derivative of the GA8, the GA10, is also being developed. It is a slightly stretched 10-seat capacity aircraft powered by a Rolls-Royce 250-B17F/2 turboprop engine. It is planned for the GA10 to retain as many common parts with the GA8 as possible.

During 2005, a floatplane model of the GA8 underwent evaluation. In 2011, the company announced that it was preparing to put the float-equipped model of the GA8 into production in partnership with American aviation float manufacturer Wipaire.

In December 2010, a Supplemental Type Certificate (STC) was issued to the manufacturer for a 200 lb. increase in MTOW.

In September 2012, the company announced that Soloy Aviation Solutions had been appointed as a GA8 component distributor for the US market. During November 2012, West Coast Aviation Services was appointed as an authorised dealer of the aircraft itself. In January 2013, a second US company, Summit Aviation, became an authorised dealer of the GA8 in the US market; Sumit reportedly planned to focus on government and surveillance aircraft sales.

At EAA Oshkosh 2014, the GA8 Airvan was renamed Mahindra Airvan 8; this rebranding is a reflection of GippsAero's recent acquisition by Indian conglomerate Mahindra Group. At the event, a company spokesperson announced that plans were underway to establish a new assembly line to produce the aircraft in North America. Mahindra has also undertaken substantial investments into its Australian facilities for the purpose of expanding its production capacity.

Design

The Mahindra Airvan 8 is an eight-seat utility aircraft designed for operations in the Australian Outback. The GA8 is powered by a single Lycoming IO-540 piston engine, replaced by a Rolls-Royce 250-B17F/2 turboprop in its GA10 derivative. It can take off within , and can operate from a  air strip under average conditions. Aviation International News has described its handling as forgiving, responsible, and akin to smaller aircraft.

The aircraft has a configuration similar to the Cessna 208 Caravan, with a rectangular fuselage. In standard seating, each passenger has a rectangular window bulged outwards to improve the downwards view. The high wing aft of the pilot improves its visibility, notably upwards. It has an aisle between the seats unlike other bush planes, cabin ventilation is evenly distributed, and upholstery is modular for rapid replacement. It has been designed to ease maintenance with minimal tooling and maximised accessibility. The cabin rear door can be opened mid-flight.

Dedicated configurations are available for skydiving, freight and intelligence, surveillance and reconnaissance (ISR) missions. It can carry up to  within an optional cargo pod, accessible through a side-door and rear-mounted hatch. For ISR missions, multiple sensors can be contained in a modular pod, such as a Wescam-supplied surveillance camera; the sensors can be retractable to appear as an ordinary cargo pod. Mission workstations can be secured upon the standard seat mounts for three operators in a standard ISR configuration.

The airframe and onboard systems are designed for durability and simplicity. The spring suspended tricycle undercarriage is oil-free; no fuel selectors have to be managed with the 92.2 gallon (349 liters) wing tanks feeding a single sump tank under the cabin floor. The simple wing has mechanically actuated flaps. The wings are rated for 92,000 hours; the lowest lifetime structural fitting, the aft vertical stabilizer fitting, have to be replaced at 15,000 hours. Avionics include a Garmin G500 multi-function display, Garmin GTN750 and 650 touchscreen satellite navigation units, and backup analog instruments.

Variants
GA8
Production version with a Textron Lycoming IO-540-K1A5 engine.

Variant with a Textron Lycoming TIO-540-AH1A engine.

Operators

228 Airvan 8s were in service as of July 2019.

Civil
The GA8 is popular with air charter companies, skydiving operators and small feeder air carriers. Larger operators include the Civil Air Patrol (CAP) which flies 18 Airvans for search and rescue operations. They are also used in CAP for long range disaster response and relief as well as airborne damage assessment missions. Mission Aviation Fellowship Australia operates 11 Airvans, providing air-transport services in developing countries. Mission Aviation Fellowship Suriname operates three Airvans.
Operators include the following:
 Air Fraser Island, Australia
 Air Kimberley, Australia
 True South Flights, New Zealand
 Glenorchy Air, New Zealand
 California Highway Patrol
 Circle Air, Iceland
 Golden Bay Air, New Zealand

Military

 Lesotho Defence Force

Accidents and incidents

On 14 July 2019, a GA8 Airvan of Skydive Umeå crashed on the nearby island of Storsandskär, killing its nine occupants. Structural failure of a wing was suspected as a cause. The GA8 Airvan was grounded by the Civil Aviation Safety Authority (CASA) in Australia, Civil Aviation Authority in New Zealand, and the European Aviation Safety Agency (EASA) in the European Union.
The grounding order was issued on 20 July and was due to run until 3 August, but was lifted early as CASA found there is no evidence for an unsafe condition, and the EASA said the wrecked aircraft had been exposed to aerodynamic loads beyond certification.

Specifications

See also

References

External links

 Mahindra Aerospace Airvan 8 Official Site
 GA October 2006 newsletter
 CASA Australia Type Certificate and Type Certificate Data Sheet
 FAA Type Certificate Data Sheet
 Specs & Photo at Flugzeuginfo.net

1990s Australian civil utility aircraft
Gippsland aircraft
Single-engined tractor aircraft
Aircraft first flown in 1995